Harold Butler is a Jamaican pianist and songwriter. He is the younger brother of Leslie "Professor" Butler.

As songwriter
 "One Step Ahead" Hammond 
 Got to Get Away 
 Love Forever by Schloss 
 Let Love be Your Righthand Man Ernest Wilson

As keyboard player
Selected discography:
on Baldhead Bridge

References

Year of birth missing (living people)
Living people
Jamaican pianists
Jamaican songwriters
21st-century pianists